An essential oil is a concentrated hydrophobic liquid containing volatile (easily evaporated at normal temperatures) chemical compounds from plants. Essential oils are also known as volatile oils, ethereal oils, aetheroleum, or simply as the oil of the plant from which they were extracted, such as oil of clove. An essential oil is essential in the sense that it contains the essence of the plant's fragrance—the characteristic fragrance of the plant from which it is derived. The term "essential" used here does not mean indispensable or usable by the human body, as with the terms essential amino acid or essential fatty acid, which are so called because they are nutritionally required by a living organism.

Essential oils are generally extracted by distillation, often by using steam. Other processes include expression, solvent extraction, sfumatura, absolute oil extraction, resin tapping, wax embedding, and cold pressing. They are used in perfumes, cosmetics, soaps, air fresheners and other products, for flavoring food and drink, and for adding scents to incense and household cleaning products.

Essential oils are often used for aromatherapy, a form of alternative medicine in which healing effects are ascribed to aromatic compounds. Aromatherapy may be useful to induce relaxation, but there is not sufficient evidence that essential oils can effectively treat any condition. Improper use of essential oils may cause harm including allergic reactions, inflammation and skin irritation.  Children may be particularly susceptible to the toxic effects of improper use. Essential oils can be poisonous if ingested or absorbed through the skin.

Production

Distillation

Most common essential oils such as lavender, peppermint, tea tree oil, patchouli, and eucalyptus are distilled. Raw plant material, consisting of the flowers, leaves, wood, bark, roots, seeds, or peel, is put into an alembic (distillation apparatus) over water. As the water is heated, the steam passes through the plant material, vaporizing the volatile compounds. The vapors flow through a coil, where they condense back to liquid, which is then collected in the receiving vessel.

Most oils are distilled in a single process. One exception is ylang-ylang (Cananga odorata) which is purified through a fractional distillation.

The recondensed water is referred to as a hydrosol, hydrolat, herbal distillate, or plant water essence, which may be sold as another fragrant product. Hydrosols include rose water, lavender water, lemon balm, clary sage, and orange blossom water.

Expression
Most citrus peel oils are expressed mechanically or cold-pressed (similar to olive oil extraction). Due to the relatively large quantities of oil in citrus peel and low cost to grow and harvest the raw materials, citrus-fruit oils are cheaper than most other essential oils. Lemon or sweet orange oils are obtained as byproducts of the citrus industry.

Before the discovery of distillation, all essential oils were extracted by pressing.

Solvent extraction
Most flowers contain too little volatile oil to undergo expression, but their chemical components are too delicate and easily denatured by the high heat used in steam distillation. Instead, a solvent such as hexane or supercritical carbon dioxide is used to extract the oils. Extracts from hexane and other hydrophobic solvents are called concretes, which are a mixture of essential oil, waxes, resins, and other lipophilic (oil-soluble) plant material.

Although highly fragrant, concretes contain large quantities of non-fragrant waxes and resins. Often, another solvent, such as ethyl alcohol, is used to extract the fragrant oil from the concrete. The precipitates are then filtered out and the ethanol is removed from the remaining solution by evaporation, vacuum purge, or both, leaving behind the absolute.

Supercritical carbon dioxide is used as a solvent in supercritical fluid extraction. This method can avoid petrochemical residues in the product and the loss of some "top notes" when steam distillation is used. It does not yield an absolute directly. The supercritical carbon dioxide will extract both the waxes and the essential oils that make up the concrete.  Subsequent processing with liquid carbon dioxide, achieved in the same extractor by merely lowering the extraction temperature, will separate the waxes from the essential oils.  This lower temperature process prevents the decomposition and denaturing of compounds. When the extraction is complete, the pressure is reduced to ambient and the carbon dioxide reverts to a gas, leaving no residue.

Production quantities

Estimates of total production of essential oils are difficult to obtain. One estimate, compiled from data in 1989, 1990, and 1994 from various sources, gives the following total production, in tonnes, of essential oils for which more than 1,000 tonnes were produced.

{| class="wikitable"
! Oil !! Tonnes
|-
| Sweet orange || style="text-align:right;"| 12,000
|-
| Mentha arvensis || style="text-align:right;"| 4,800
|-
| Peppermint || style="text-align:right;"| 3,200
|-
| Cedarwood || style="text-align:right;"| 2,600
|-
| Lemon || style="text-align:right;"| 2,300
|-
| Eucalyptus globulus || style="text-align:right;"| 2,070
|-
| Litsea cubeba || style="text-align:right;"| 2,000
|-
| Clove (leaf) || style="text-align:right;"| 2,000
|-
| Spearmint || style="text-align:right;"| 1,300
|}

Uses and cautions

Taken by mouth, many essential oils can be dangerous in high concentrations. Typical effects begin with a burning feeling, followed by salivation. Different essential oils may have drastically different pharmacology. Some act as local anesthetic counterirritants and, thereby, exert an antitussive (cough suppressing) effect. Many essential oils, particularly tea tree oil, may cause contact dermatitis. Menthol and some others produce a feeling of cold followed by a sense of burning.

In Australia essential oils have been increasingly causing cases of poisoning, mostly of children. In the period 2014–2018 there were 4,412 poisoning incidents reported in New South Wales.

Use in aromatherapy

Aromatherapy is a form of alternative medicine in which healing effects are ascribed to the aromatic compounds in essential oils and other plant extracts. Aromatherapy may be useful to induce relaxation, but there is not sufficient evidence that essential oils can effectively treat any condition. Scientific research indicates that essential oils cannot treat or cure any chronic disease or other illnesses. Much of the research on the use of essential oils for health purposes has serious methodological errors. In a systemic review of 201 published studies on essential oils as alternative medicines, only 10 were found to be of acceptable methodological quality, and even these 10 were still weak in reference to scientific standards. Use of essential oils may cause harm including allergic reactions and skin irritation; there has been at least one case of death.

Use as pesticide 

Research has shown that some essential oils have potential as a natural pesticide. In case studies, certain oils have been shown to have a variety of deterring effects on pests, specifically insects and select arthropods. These effects may include repelling, inhibiting digestion, stunting growth, decreasing rate of reproduction, or death of pests that consume the oil. However, the molecules within the oils that cause these effects are normally non-toxic for mammals. These specific actions of the molecules allow for widespread use of these "green" pesticides without harmful effects to anything else other than pests. Essential oils that have been investigated include rose, lemon grass, lavender, thyme, peppermint, basil, and eucalyptus.

Although they may not be the perfect replacement for all synthetic pesticides, essential oils have prospects for crop or indoor plant protection, urban pest control, and marketed insect repellents, such as bug spray. Certain essential oils have been shown in studies to be comparable, if not exceeding, in effectiveness to DEET, which is currently marketed as the most effective mosquito repellent. Although essential oils are effective as pesticides when first applied in uses such as mosquito repellent applied to the skin, it is only effective in the vapor stage. Since this stage is relatively short-lived, creams and polymer mixtures are used in order to elongate the vapor period of effective repellency.

In any form, using essential oils as green pesticides rather than synthetic pesticides has ecological benefits such as decreased residual actions. In addition, increased use of essential oils as pest control could have not only ecological, but economical benefits as the essential oil market diversifies and popularity increases among organic farmers and environmentally conscious consumers.  some EOs are authorized, and in use, in the European Union: Melaleuca oil as a fungicide, citronella oil as a herbicide, Syzygium aromaticum oil as a fungicide and bactericide, Mentha spicata oil as a plant growth regulator; Citrus sinensis oil (only in France) for Bemisia tabaci on Cucurbita pepo and Trialeurodes vaporariorum on Solanum lycopersicum; and approvals for oils of Thymus, C. sinensis, and Tagetes as insecticides are pending.

Use in food 
In relation with their food applications, although these oils have been used throughout history as food preservatives, it was in the 20th century when EOs were considered as Generally Recognized as Safe (GRAS) by the Food and Drug Administration (FDA).

GRAS substances according to the FDA

As antimicrobials
The most commonly used essential oils with antimicrobial action are: β-caryophyllene, eugenol, eugenol acetate, carvacrol, linalool, thymol, geraniol, geranyl acetate, bicyclogermacrene, cinnamaldehyde, geranial, neral, 1,8-cineole, methyl chavicol, methyl cinnamate, methyl eugenol, camphor, α-thujone, viridiflorol, limonene, (Z)-linalool oxide, α-pinene, p-cymene, (E)-caryophyllene, γ-terpinene.

Some essential oils are effective antimicrobials and have been evaluated for food incorporation in vitro. However, actual deployment is rare because much higher concentrations are required in real foods. Some or all of this lower effectiveness is due to large differences between culture medium and foods in: chemistry (especially lipid content), viscosity, and duration of inoculation/storage.

Dilution

Essential oils are usually lipophilic (literally: "oil-loving") compounds that are immiscible (not miscible) with water. They can be diluted in solvents like pure ethanol and polyethylene glycol.

Raw materials

Essential oils are derived from sections of plants. Some plants, like the bitter orange, are sources of several types of essential oil.

{| class="wikitable" |
| valign="top" |
Bark
 Cassia
 Cinnamon
 Sassafras

Berries
 Allspice
 Juniper

Flowers
 Cannabis
 Chamomile
 Clary sage
 Clove
 Hops
 Hyssop
 Jasmine
 Lavender
 Manuka
 Marjoram
 Orange
 Pelargonium (Scented geranium)
 Plumeria
 Rose
 Ylang-ylang
| valign="top" |

Leaves
 Basil
 Bay leaf
 Buchu
 Cinnamon
 Common sage
 Eucalyptus
 Guava
 Lemon grass
 Melaleuca
 Oregano
 rose
 bergamot
 Patchouli
 Peppermint
 Pine
 Rosemary
 Spearmint
 Tea tree
 Thyme
 Tsuga
 Wintergreen
Peel
 Bergamot
 Grapefruit
 Lemon
 Lime
 Orange
 Tangerine
| valign="top" |

Resin

Benzoin
 Copaiba
 Frankincense
 Labdanum
 Myrrh

Rhizome

Galangal
 Ginger

Roots

Valerian

Seeds

Anise
 Buchu
 Celery
 Cumin
 Flax
 Nutmeg oil

Woods

Agarwood
 Camphor
 Cedar
 Rosewood
 Sandalwood
|}

Balsam of Peru
Balsam of Peru, an essential oil derived from Myroxylon plants, is used in food and drink for flavoring, in perfumes and toiletries for fragrance, and in animal care products. However, national and international surveys identified balsam of Peru among the "top five" allergens most commonly causing patch test allergic reactions in people referred to dermatology clinics.

Garlic oil
Garlic oil is an essential oil derived from garlic.

Eucalyptus oil

Most eucalyptus oil on the market is produced from the leaves of Eucalyptus globulus. Steam-distilled eucalyptus oil is used throughout Asia, Africa, Latin America and South America as a primary cleaning/disinfecting agent added to soaped mop and countertop cleaning solutions; it also possesses insect and limited vermin control properties. Note, however, there are hundreds of species of eucalyptus, and perhaps some dozens are used to various extents as sources of essential oils. Not only do the products of different species differ greatly in characteristics and effects, but also the products of the very same tree can vary grossly.

Lavender oil

Lavender oil has long been used in the production of perfume. However, studies have shown it can be estrogenic and antiandrogenic, causing problems for prepubescent boys and pregnant women, in particular. Lavender essential oil is also used as an insect repellent.

Rose oil

Rose oil is produced from the petals of  Rosa damascena and Rosa centifolia. Steam-distilled rose oil is known as "rose otto", while the solvent extracted product is known as "rose absolute".

Toxicity

The potential toxicity of essential oil is related to its level or grade of purity, and to the toxicity of specific chemical components of the oil. Many essential oils are designed exclusively for their aroma-therapeutic quality; these essential oils generally should not be applied directly to the skin in their undiluted form. Some can cause severe irritation, provoke an allergic reaction and, over time, prove toxic to the liver. If ingested or rubbed into the skin, essential oils can be highly poisonous, causing confusion, choking, loss of muscle coordination, difficulty in breathing, pneumonia, seizures, and possibly severe allergic reactions or coma.

Some essential oils, including many of the citrus peel oils, are photosensitizers, increasing vulnerability of the skin to sunlight.

Industrial users of essential oils should consult the safety data sheets to determine the hazards and handling requirements of particular oils. Even certain therapeutic-grade oils can pose potential threats to individuals with epilepsy or pregnant women.

Essential oil use in children can pose a danger when misused because of their thin skin and immature livers. This might cause them to be more susceptible to toxic effects than adults.

Flammability
The flash point of each essential oil is different.  Many of the common essential oils, such as tea tree, lavender, and citrus oils, are classed as Class 3 Flammable Liquids, as they have a flash point of 50–60 °C.

Gynecomastia
Estrogenic and antiandrogenic activity have been reported by in vitro study of tea tree oil and lavender essential oils. Two published sets of case reports suggest that lavender oil may be implicated in some cases of gynecomastia, an abnormal breast tissue growth in prepubescent boys. The European Commission's Scientific Committee on Consumer Safety dismissed the claims against tea tree oil as implausible, but did not comment on lavender oil. In 2018, a BBC report on a study stated that tea tree and lavender oils contain eight substances that when tested in tissue culture experiments, increasing the level of estrogen and decreasing the level of testosterone. Some of the substances are found in "at least 65 other essential oils". The study did not include animal or human testing.

Handling
Exposure to essential oils may cause contact dermatitis. Essential oils can be aggressive toward rubbers and plastics, so care must be taken in choosing the correct handling equipment. Glass syringes are often used, but have coarse volumetric graduations. Chemistry syringes are ideal, as they resist essential oils, are long enough to enter deep vessels, and have fine graduations, facilitating quality control. Unlike traditional pipettes, which have difficulty handling viscous fluids, the chemistry syringe, also known as a positive displacement pipette, has a seal and piston arrangement which slides inside the pipette, wiping the essential oil off the pipette wall.

Ingestion
Some essential oils qualify as GRAS flavoring agents for use in foods, beverages, and confectioneries according to strict good manufacturing practice and flavorist standards. Pharmacopoeia standards for medicinal oils should be heeded. Some oils can be toxic to some domestic animals, cats in particular. The internal use of essential oils can pose hazards to pregnant women, as some can be abortifacients in dose 0.5–10 mL, and thus should not be used during pregnancy.

Pesticide residues
Concern about pesticide residues in essential oils, particularly those used therapeutically, means many practitioners of aromatherapy buy organically produced oils. Not only are pesticides present in trace quantities, but also the oils themselves are used in tiny quantities and usually in high dilutions. Where there is a concern about pesticide residues in food essential oils, such as mint or orange oils, the proper criterion is not solely whether the material is organically produced, but whether it meets the government standards based on actual analysis of its pesticide content.

Pregnancy
Some essential oils may contain impurities and additives that may be harmful to pregnant women. Certain essential oils are safe to use during pregnancy, but care must be taken when selecting quality and brand.  Sensitivity to certain smells may cause pregnant women to have adverse side effects with essential oil use, such as headache, vertigo, and nausea. Pregnant women often report an abnormal sensitivity to smells and taste, and essential oils can cause irritation and nausea when ingested.

Toxicology
LD50 is intended as a guideline only, and reported values can vary widely due to differences in tested species and testing conditions.

Standardization of derived products
In 2002, ISO published ISO 4720 in which the botanical names of the relevant plants are standardized. The rest of the standards with regards to this topic can be found in the section of ICS 71.100.60

History

The resins of aromatics and plant extracts were retained to produce traditional medicines and scented preparations, such as perfumes and incense, including frankincense, myrrh, cedarwood, juniper berry and cinnamon in ancient Egypt may have contained essential oils. In 1923, when archaeologists opened Pharaoh Tutankhamun’s tomb, they found 50 alabaster jars of essential oils.

Essential oils have been used in folk medicine over centuries. The Persian physician Ibn Sina, known as Avicenna in Europe, was first to derive the fragrance of flowers from distillation, while the earliest recorded mention of the techniques and methods used to produce essential oils may be Ibn al-Baitar (1188–1248), an Arab Al-Andalusian (Muslim Spain) physician, pharmacist and chemist.

Rather than refer to essential oils themselves, modern works typically discuss specific chemical compounds of which the essential oils are composed, such as referring to methyl salicylate rather than "oil of wintergreen".

Essential oils are used in aromatherapy, a branch of alternative medicine that uses essential oils and other aromatic compounds. Oils are volatilized, diluted in a carrier oil and used in massage, diffused in the air by a nebulizer or diffuser,  heated over a candle flame, or burned as incense.

See also

 Aroma lamp
 Enfleurage
 Fragrance oil
 List of essential oils
 Tincture
 Volatility

References

Further reading